Isaac Toah N'Tow (born 26 May 1994) is a Ghanaian professional footballer who plays as a winger for Maltese club Birkirkara.

Club career
Ntow started his youth career at Internazionale, being promoted to Primavera side in July 2010. On 31 January 2013 he moved to Brescia in a co-ownership deal for a peppercorn fee. Ntow picked no.14 shirt. On 20 June 2013 the remain 50% registration rights of Ntow was given to Brescia for free.

On 15 March 2014 Ntow played his first match as a professional, coming on as a second-half substitute in a 0–2 loss at Palermo.

In summer 2015 he was signed by Chievo on a free transfer. On 21 August he was farmed to Serie B club Calcio Como. In January 2016 Ntow was loaned to Lega Pro side A.C. Renate.

On 19 July 2016 Ntow was signed by Sambenedettese.

References

External links

1994 births
Living people
Ghanaian footballers
Association football wingers
Serie B players
Brescia Calcio players
Como 1907 players
A.S. Sambenedettese players
Hibernians F.C. players
Birkirkara F.C. players
Serie C players
Serie D players
Maltese Premier League players
Ghanaian expatriate footballers
Ghanaian expatriate sportspeople in Italy
Expatriate footballers in Italy
Expatriate footballers in Malta